Two for the Road is a 1967 soundtrack album by Henry Mancini of music for the film Two for the Road.

Two for the Road was nominated for the Golden Globe Award for Best Original Score at the 25th Golden Globe Awards of 1967.

Reception

The initial Billboard review from May 20, 1967, writing that Mancini "scores again" in his "inimitable style" and that the album "contains the freshness and dexterity that Mancini injects in all of his award-winning tracks. A polished performance throughout". The album was one of Billboards 'Pop Picks' for the week.

Greg Adams reviewed the album for Allmusic and wrote that "Only the repetition of the title track interferes with enjoying Two for the Road on its own terms as a varied and entertaining album of mostly instrumental music" and praised the "Mantovani-style strings and jazzy horn solos to a surf beat" of "Something for Audrey" and "Congarocka".

Track listing 
All compositions by Henry Mancini. Lyrics to "Two for the Road" by Leslie Bricusse.
 "Two for the Road" – 2:44
 "Something for Audrey" – 3:02
 "The Lovely Life" – 2:20
 "The Chaser" – 2:36
 "Something Loose" – 2:50
 "Happy Barefoot Boy" – 2:51
 "Two for the Road (Main Title)" – 2:44
 "Congarocka" – 3:13
 "French Provincial" – 2:12
 "The Donk" – 2:47
 "Domain St. Juste" – 1:27
 "Two for the Road" – 3:17

Personnel 
Henry Mancini - arranger,  conductor, piano
Dick Bogert - engineer
Joe Reisman - production

References

1967 soundtrack albums
RCA Victor soundtracks
Henry Mancini albums